, born May 19, 1986 is a Japanese actress and model.  She appeared in the movie Kekko Kamen played Wakana Nakai in 2004 and worked with Go Nagai.  Currently she lives in Los Angeles, California working on American movies in both English-language and Japanese-language.  In 2008, Moa was cast in the lead role of Izumi Nakamara in the film Sakura.

External links 
 

Japanese actresses
Living people
1986 births
Japanese expatriates in the United States